Edangimangalam Vellanur is a village in the Trichirapalli district of Tamil Nadu in southern India.  It is 27 kilometers away from Trichirapalli.  It located on the way from Trichirapalli to Chidambaram on Highway NH227.

Villages in Tiruchirappalli district